Acroleucus marinoi is a species from the genus Acroleucus.

References

Lygaeidae
Insects described in 1980